Andrea MacPherson is a Canadian poet and novelist.

Biography
Born in 1976 Vancouver, British Columbia, she was educated at the University of British Columbia where she received a Master's Degree in Creative Writing.  Works as a freelance editor and lecturer; currently teaching writing with Malaspina University College and Simon Fraser University's writing and publishing program, and with University College of the Fraser Valley. MacPherson also taught writing classes at various colleges, including Kwantlen University College and University College of the Fraser Valley. Served as editor of Prism International.

MacPherson was the Editor of Prism Internationalfrom 2000–2001 and took over the position of Reviews Editor with Event  in 2006.  She held the position until 2010.

MacPherson's first novel, When She Was Electric, was published in 2003 with Raincoast.  The novel later went on to be named No. 6 on Canada Reads: People's Choice. Her second novel, Beyond the Blue, was published in 2007 by Random House Canada and details the lives of four women in 1918 Dundee, Scotland.

Natural Disasters was released in July, 2007 by Palimpsest Press and is concerned with shared history and the influence of geography on the self, detailing much of the landscape of British Columbia.  It was longlisted for the 2008 ReLit Awards.  Her second collection, Away was published in 2008 by Signature Editions.  It is a collection of travel poems, ranging from an execution yard in Dublin, Ireland to the calderas of Santorini, Greece.  Her poetry was anthologized in 2009's How the Light Gets In, published by the Waterford Institute of Technology, Ireland.

Selected works 
 2003: When She Was Electric Raincoast
 2007: Beyond the Blue Random House
 2007: Natural Disasters Palimpsest Press
 2008: Away: Poems Signature Editions
 2009: How the Light Gets In Waterford Institute

External links 

Canadian women poets
21st-century Canadian novelists
21st-century Canadian poets
Canadian people of Scottish descent
Writers from Vancouver
Canadian women novelists
Year of birth missing (living people)
Living people
University of British Columbia alumni
21st-century Canadian women writers